Zacharias Theodorou (born July 7, 1993 in Larnaca) is a Cypriot football central midfielder for PO Xylotymbou.

He played for the Cyprus UEFA European Under-19.

Career

Anorthosis Famagusta FC

Season 2011-12
Zacharias Theodorou signed a professional contract with Anorthosis in September 2011 until 2016. At the same season Theodorou played in 2 games for the Championship against Alki and Ethnikos Achna both match as a substitution for only 4 minutes. Theodorou played for all 3 matches of Anorthosis Famagusta in cup and he score his first goal with Anorthosis shirt against PAEEK FC on Anorthosis Victory 6–0.

Ayia Napa FC

Season 2012-13
The 19year-old international with Cyprus U21 made a very good season with Ayia Napa. He was given many chances after he played in 12 matches in the starting lineup and other 4 as a substitution with a total participation time 1,155 minutes in the championship.

PO Xylotymbou
On 21 June 2019, Theodorou joined PO Xylotymbou.

References

External links
Profile at uefa.com

1993 births
Living people
Cypriot footballers
People from Larnaca
Cyprus under-21 international footballers
Cypriot First Division players
Anorthosis Famagusta F.C. players
Ayia Napa FC players
Ermis Aradippou FC players
Nea Salamis Famagusta FC players
Onisilos Sotira players
Association football midfielders